Thatch Caye is an island in Belize, located  off of the coast of Dangriga, about two miles from the Belize Barrier Reef.  The  island is near Southwater Caye, Tobacco Caye, Cocoplum Caye, and Fantasy Caye and South Water Caye Marine Reserve.

The island is home to five locals, according to the 2012 census, and is a tourist destination. Thatch Caye Resort is a resort managed by Muy'Ono  located on the island that limits occupancy to no more than 30 people.

The name Thatch Caye originated  from island co-owner Travis Holub, who built each residence with thatched roofs. Each of the five thatched-roof structures stand high over the water, making them over-the-water bungalows.

References 

Islands of Belize
Populated places in Belize
Caribbean Sea